The 2012–13 Primera División season (known as the Campeonato JPS 2012-13 for sponsorship reasons) is the 94th of Costa Rica's top-flight professional football league. The season was divided into two championships: the Invierno and the Verano. Club Sport Uruguay de Coronado is one of the new members.

The Invierno season was dedicated to Carlos "Cañón" González.

Campeonato de Invierno
The tournament began on 25 July 2012 and will end on 23 December 2012.

First Stage

Standings

Results

Second stage

Semifinals

First legs

Second legs

Finals

First leg

Second leg

Campeonato de Verano
The tournament began on 1 January 2013 and ended on 5 May 2013.

First Stage

Standings

Results

Second stage

References

External links
Unafut

Liga FPD seasons
1
Costa